Nagłowice  is a village in Jędrzejów County, Świętokrzyskie Voivodeship, in south-central Poland.

It is the seat of the gmina (administrative district) called Gmina Nagłowice.

The village has a population of 950.

Mikołaj Rej (1505-1569), the father of Polish literature, lived in the village.

References

Villages in Jędrzejów County
Kielce Governorate
Kielce Voivodeship (1919–1939)